The Battle of Yenangyaung was fought in Burma, now Myanmar, during the Burma Campaign in World War II. The battle of Yenaungyaung was fought in the vicinity of Yenangyaung and its oil fields.

Background
After the Japanese captured Rangoon in March 1942, the Allies regrouped in Central Burma. The newly formed Burma Corps, commanded by Lieutenant General William Slim and consisting of British, Indian and locally raised Burmese troops, attempted to defend the Irrawaddy River valley, while the Chinese Expeditionary Force (in Burma) defended the Sittaung River valley to the east. After the Japanese captured Singapore and the Dutch East Indies, they were able to use divisions released by these successes and captured trucks to reinforce their army in Burma and launch attacks into Central Burma.

One of the Japanese objectives in the Irrawaddy River valley was the Yenangyaung oil fields. The battle for the oil fields started on 10 April and continued for a week. The Japanese attacked 1st Burma Division on the Allied right and 48th Indian Infantry Brigade at Kokkogwa at night in a storm and were repulsed with heavy casualties. On the next day, 2nd Royal Tank Regiment (2nd RTR) was in action near Magwe at Thadodan and Alebo. From 13 to 17 April, the British fell back under attacks by the Japanese. On several occasions Japanese roadblocks split the Burma Frontier Force (an internal security force acting as infantry), 1st Burma Division, the British 7th Armoured Brigade HQ and 2nd RTR into three forces.

On 15 April, Lieutenant General Slim gave orders for the oil fields and refinery to be demolished. The situation became so critical that General Harold Alexander, commanding the Burma Army, asked Lieutenant General Joseph Stilwell, the American commander of the China Burma India Theater and Chief of Staff to Chiang Kai-shek, to move the Chinese 38th Division immediately into the Yenaungyaung area.

Battle
On 16 April, almost 7,000 British soldiers, and 500 prisoners and civilians were encircled by an equal number of Japanese soldiers from the IJA 33rd Division at Yenangyaung and its oil field. 

The 33rd Division was able to advance between Slim's 17 Division at Taungdwingyi and the 1st Burma division south of Yenangyaung.  Fearing that his BurCorps may become trapped, Slim called upon Sun Li-jen's Chinese 38th Division for help.

General Sun requested to lead his entire division to the rescue of 1st Burma Division, but General Lo Cho-ying, commander of the Chinese Expeditionary Force in Burma, refused. On 17 April, General Sun instead led his 113th Regiment with only 1,121 men, of which only 800 were combat personnel, in the mission. Because the Chinese had no artillery or tanks, Lieutenant General Slim assigned the 7th Armoured Brigade, commanded by Brigadier John Anstice, to General Sun. The brigade consisted of two regiments (battalions) of M3 Stuart light tanks and a battery of 25-pounder guns.

For the next three days the Chinese attacked southwards.

Meanwhile, 1st Burma Division fought its way to and across the Pin Chaung river where they met with the relief column on 19 April. On the next day, the Chinese force attacked south toward Yenaungyaung and Pin Chaung. The attack caused the Japanese to suffer heavy casualties, but the Allied forces were too weak to hold the oil fields and had to retreat to the north.

Results
For the British, according to Allen, "Deprived of a supply port at Rangoon, then of its source of fuel at Yenangyaung, the question was no longer whether to retreat, but where to?"

See also
 Yenangyaung
 Battle of Toungoo
 Chinese Army in India
 New 1st Army
 Du Yuming
 Sun Liren
 National Revolutionary Army

Notes

Sources
 Hsu Long-hsuen and Chang Ming-kai, History of The Sino-Japanese War (1937–1945), 2nd Ed., 1971. Translated by Wen Ha-hsiung, Chung Wu Publishing; 33, 140th Lane, Tung-hwa Street, Taipei, Taiwan Republic of China. Pg. 377

External links
 
 Topographic map of Yenangyaung
 Postcard "Battle of Yenangyaung"
 https://web.archive.org/web/20080306041004/http://www.science.uwaterloo.ca/~cchieh/sun/honor.html

Military history of Burma during World War II
World War II operations and battles of the Southeast Asia Theatre
1942 in Burma
Conflicts in 1942
Yenangyaung
April 1942 events